Pulluvazhi  is a small village in Rayamangalam Grama punchyathu in the Ernakulam district of Kerala state, India. It is close to the towns Perumbavoor, Muvattupuzha and Kothamangalam.

Pulluvazhi is the birthplace of many people representatives in the Kerala legislature. K.G .Rohithakshan Kartha (KGR Kartha), represented Seventh Kerala Legislative Assembly as Minister for Health; Communist Party veteran and former Chief Editor of Deshabhimani, P. Govinda Pillai, well known educationalist Rev K.C. Paily were born in Pulluvazhy. Padayatt Kesavapillai Vasudevan Nair (PKV), the 9th Chief Minister of Kerala also had firm connections in this village and his memorial service had performed here. Famous Nangelil Ayurvedic Marmma Therapy Doctors are from Pulluvazhi. Sister Rani Maria Vattalil, also known as Indore Rani was also born in this village. Sister Rani Maria was murdered in a knife attack by a hitman named Samandar Singh at Nachanbore Hill in Indore, Madhya Pradesh on 25 February 1995. The murder was arranged because some landlords were offended by her work among the landless poor. Later on, her family forgave her murderer. The documentary The Heart of a Murderer, depicting the murder and subsequent repentance of Samandar Singh was the winner at the World Interfaith Harmony Film Festival 2013. The writer and social critique M.P. Narayana Pillai, P.R. Sivan, former MLA and renowned drama director Kalady Gopi were also from Pulluvazhy.

Above all, Pulluvazhi is renowned for its unity against Hartal, a common strike practice in India by restraining public to work, to travel, to shop etc. Pulluvazhy gave mere importance to this strike and never supported any kind of such strike. The entire village is very much alive in a Harthal Day, and is a solace to most of the travelers as the village is besides Airport-Kottayam MC Road. The only two occasions when the village had downed shutters were when Communist leaders P. Govinda Pillai, P K V and P.R. Sivan died. Stamba Boys Arts and Sports Club, a well-known club in Kerala, is located at Pulluvazhi.

 
Currently, the village is famous for timber business.

Population 
Population: 25,691 
Males: 12,841
Females: 12,850
Number of Households: 5,928

Landmarks

Temples
Kuttikkattu Mahadeva Temple
Nangelil Bhagavathy Temple
Koottumadom Sree Subramanya swami Temple
Perakkattu Sree Mahadeva Temple

Churches
St. Thomas Catholic Church Pulluvazhy. A pilgrim station. Most attractions are St. Antony's Chapel and Sr Rani Maria Museum.
Mar Gregorious Jacobite Syrian Chapel
Ashram
Mata Amritanandamayi Math

Colleges
San Joe college of nursing

Schools
Jayakeralam Higher Secondary School
St.Josephs Convent English medium higher secondary  School 
Lower Primary School

Sports club
lunic Pulluvazhy volleyball team.

Stamba Boys
 Arts and sports club
 Mariyapuram Brothers

Prominent Ancestral
Nangelil, Kappillil, Chittuparambans, Nangelimalil, Thazhuthekudy, Malikkathazathu, Poonelil, Karimattathu, Kavanakudy, Kavanamalil, Ovumgamalil, Chakiyarampuram, Vettikalil, Vellanjil, Nadamkuzhy, Edayathu,  Puthenpurackal, Panachickal, Parayil, Kuzhikkattil.

References

External links 

Kuruppampady
Wikimap
ST. Josephs school
San Jose college
Facebook Page of Pulluvazhy village
[ C. P. Varkey, Healing The Heart Of Emotional Wounds, St Pauls BYB, 2004, p. 120.]

Villages in Ernakulam district